Molham (Arabic: مُلهَم) is an A-Pop artist, songwriter, and entrepreneur from Jeddah, Saudi Arabia. He is best known for his debut EP's single Me Against The World which peaked at #5 on the top hip-hop chart on Anghami, trending across 7 different countries in the Middle East and North Africa.

Early life and education 
Molham was born in Jeddah, Saudi Arabia. He moved to London, Ontario, Canada at an early age, before settling back in Jeddah, Saudi Arabia. He attended Dar Jana International High School. Later, he moved to the United States, where he studied Finance and Economics at Georgetown University in Washington DC and launched Melties, an Ice Cream Cookie Sandwich business.

Musical career 
Molham began his career while at high school where he started to jot down lyrics and used to join rap contests with his peers during breaks. While at University, Molham performed as part of a duo called 705B in coffee shops, talent shows and radio stations.

Following graduation, Molham relocated to Dubai where he joined the global management consulting firm, Bain & Company. While working at Bain & Company, Molham launched his music career, and performed for the first time publicly on stage in Saudi Arabia.

In March 2018, Molham released his debut EP, The Time Is Yesterday featuring Egyptian singer Malak El-Husseiny and Minneapolis-native Yusra J. In September, he released his single Saudi Citizen in the Saudi National Day. In November, he was one of 4 finalists in the fifth edition Yasalam's Emerging Talent Competition.

In July 2020, Molham released his song Khayali, the song has crossed a total of 1.5M streams across streaming platforms.

Molham's song Sukkar was released in February 2022 featuring Saudi Arabian singer Dyler and produced by Hiam Salibi.

Molham has stated that he is personally inspired by Lauv, Russ, Kyle and Chance the Rapper.

Musical style 
Molham is known for being the first self-proclaimed A-pop (Arabic pop) artist. His musical style fuses Arabic and Khaleeji rap with Western pop, generating a new sub-genre of music which he called A-pop, a sound best defined by his track, Khayali. Molham coined the term A-pop after the release of Khayali, first mentioning it in an Arab News article published on December 1, 2020.

Discography 
Selected discography of Molham includes:

Singles:

 Sukkar ft. Dyler — 2022
 Galbi — 2022
 Lehalaha — 2021
 Sushi — 2021
 Hiya Wana — 2021
 Kerry Washington — 2021
 Rayeh — 2020
 Khayali — 2020
 Superpower — 2020
 Wahashtini — 2020
 Fast Lane ft. Rayan — 2020
 Clean Sheets —  2019
 Find My Way — 2019
 Saudi Citizen — 2018
 1802 — 2018

EP:

The Time Is Yesterday (2018)
 Psychic
 Me Against The World — ft. Malak
 Easy Come Easy Go — ft. Yusra J

References

External links 
 Official website

Year of birth missing (living people)
Living people
Saudi Arabian musicians
Arabic hip hop
21st-century rappers
21st-century Saudi Arabian businesspeople
People from Jeddah